Lethe kansa, the bamboo forester, is a species of Satyrinae butterfly found in the  Indomalayan realm

Subspecies
L. k. kansa Sikkim, Kumaon to Assam, Burma
L. k. zeugitana  Fruhstorfer, 1911  Assam, Manipur
L. k. vaga  Fruhstorfer, 1911  Burma, Thailand, Yunnan

References

kansa
Butterflies of Asia
Butterflies of Indochina